Benjamin Becker was the defending champion, but he chose to not participate this year.Michael Berrer won in the final 6–3, 7–6(4) against Andrey Golubev.

Seeds

Draw

Finals

Top half

Bottom half

External links
Main Draw
Qualifying Draw

Intersport Heilbronn Open - Singles
2010 Singles